Prince Michael Feodorovich Romanoff (4 May 1924 – 22 September 2008) was a French filmmaker. A descendant of the Russian Emperors, he was a great nephew of the last Russian Tsar, Nicholas II.

Early life
Prince Michael Feodorovich was born in Paris, the only son of Prince Feodor Alexandrovich of Russia and his wife Princess Irina Pavlovna Paley. He descended from the Romanovs through both his father and his mother. Through his father he was a grandson of Grand Duke Alexander Mikhailovich of Russia and his wife Grand Duchess Xenia Alexandrovna of Russia. His mother was a daughter of Grand Duke Paul Alexandrovich of Russia and his second wife Princess Olga Valerianovna Paley, Countess of Hohenfelsen. Prince Michael Feodorovich was called in France Michel Romanoff de Russie (his civil name in his French identity papers). He was brought up in Paris and Biarritz. As a child he learned to speak French, English and Russian. In his later years he learned Spanish and Catalan.

After the separation of his parents in 1932, Prince Michael Feodorovich went to live with his mother in Neuilly where he attended the École du Montcel school. Following the outbreak of World War II his family moved back to Biarritz. He served in the French infantry between 1945 and 1946 and accompanied the army of General Leclerc into Germany.

Career
For sometime he worked for the Societé des Parfums of Lucien Lelong, who had been married to his aunt Princess Natalie Paley. In 1949, Prince Michael Feodorovich moved into the film industry working as an assistant director, later becoming a director of production. He worked, among others, with René Clair, Julien Duvivier and Henri-Georges Clouzot. Burt Lancaster, Tony Curtis, Gina Lollobrigida and Marlon Brando were some of the well-known actors who appeared in his films. In the 1950s the prince had an affair with actress Annabella (1907–1996), after the latter had divorced the American actor Tyrone Power. Their love affair lasted ten years, and despite their age difference the French actress would have liked to marry the prince. They later split, but Michael Feodorovich remained very attached to Annabella until her death.

After retiring from the industry in 1985 he spent his retirement living between Biarritz and Neuilly. After his second marriage he brought a house in L'Escala on the Costa Brava. Prince Michael Feodorovich joined the Romanov Family Association on its creation in 1979.

Prince Michael Feodorovich first visited Russia in 1990. He made another trip in 1994 to attend a book launch with the St Petersburg authorities looking to provide him with a house in return for his help in promoting Russian culture. When asked about the house he said "First the house, then I'll ask for a passport." He made another visit to Russia in 1997 to attend the opening of his Romanov photographic exhibition which was also attended by a number of his cousins. Prince Michael Feodorovich refused to attend with other members of the Imperial family, the burial of his great uncle Nicholas II as he doubted the bones were genuine. He later tried unsuccessfully to prevent the reburial of the remains in St Petersburg of his great-grandmother, the Dowager Empress Maria Feodorovna, as he felt that "members of the Imperial family who died in exile should stay where they passed away".

Prince Michael Feodorovich died in Paris at the age of 84. His cousin Prince Michael Andreevich of Russia died in Sydney on the same day.

Marriages and children
Prince Michael Feodorovich married firstly Helga Staufenberger (b. 1926) in Paris on 15 October 1958. They had one son before divorcing in 1992.
Prince Michael Mihailovich (31 July 1959 – 24 January 2001)

After his divorce he was married secondly in Josse on 15 January 1994 to Maria de las Mercedes Ustrell-Cabani (b. 1960). In 1995 he adopted his granddaughter Tatiana Alexandra (b. 1986), the daughter of his son, the late Prince Michael Paul Mihailovich, and respective widow.

Filmography as assistant director
 1957 : Pot-Bouille directed by Julien Duvivier
 1949 : Black Jak directed by Julien Duvivier
 1961 : Fanny directed by Joshua Logan
 1951 : Juliette ou la clé des songes directed by Marcel Carné
 1967 : Diaboliquement vôtre directed by Julien Duvivier
 1957 : L'Homme à l'imperméable directed by Julien Duvivier
 1953 : Le retour de Don Camillo directed by Julien Duvivier
 1955 : Les Diaboliques directed by Henri-Georges Clouzot
 1959 : Marie-Octobre directed by Julien Duvivier
 1965 : Le dimanche de la vie directed by Jean Herman
 1968 : Un soir, un train directed by Jean Delvaux
 1967 : Les Demoiselles de Rochefort directed by Agnès Varda and Jacques Demy
 1967 : Trois Chambres à Manhattan directed by Marcel Carné
 1957 : Les espions directed by Henri-Georges Clouzot
 1956 : Trapèze directed by Carol Reed
 1953 : Les Orgueilleux directed by Yves Allégret and Rafael E. Portas
 1953 : Le Salaire de la peur directed by Henri-Georges Clouzot
 1956 : Anastasia directed by Anatole Litvak.

Ancestry

References

External links

Romanoff Family Association

1924 births
2008 deaths
Film directors from Paris
House of Romanov in exile